Agatti Island is a 7.6 km long island, situated on a coral atoll called Agatti atoll in the Union Territory of Lakshadweep, India.

Geography
Agatti is located about 364 km off Kannur, 394 km off Kozhikode, and 459 km (285 mi) off Kochi in the mainland and 7 km to the southwest of Bangaram, the nearest island. Agatti is 531 km away from Kollam (Quilon) and 529 km away from Kollam Port. Kavaratti, the closest inhabited island, lies 54 km to the SE and Suheli Par atoll 76 km to the south. Kalpatti is located at the southern end on the same reef.

Climate

Population
Its population in the 2011 census was 7,560, and Islam is the main religion of the islanders. Islamic religion is said to have been brought by Arab traveller Ibn Batuta. Most people speak Malayalam, English and Tamil. Agatti has its own 100 kW powerhouse which uses fuel to generate electricity. There is a desalination unit which provides desalinated water to the islanders.

Transportation

Sea
Lakshwadeep is connected to Cochin by sea route. Seven passenger ships operate between the two ports and it takes 14–20 hours for the passage.

Air
The  Agatti Aerodrome  is the only airport in Lakshadweep.

Tourism
Agatti is one of the Lakshadweep islands open to tourism. Visitors, however, are allowed to the Island under certain restrictions. They are required to obtain Entry Permit from the Lakshadweep Administration for entering or visiting the island. Entry Permit is issued based on the visitor having a confirmed place to stay. There are only two hotels or resorts in Agatti: Agatti Island Beach Resort (AIBER) and the other is Sea Shells Beach Resort. A road runs through the island, which can be best enjoyed by hiring a bicycle available at many places.

Water sports activities such as scuba diving, wind surfing, snorkelling, surfing, kayaking, canoeing, water skiing, sportfishing, yachting and night sea voyages are popular activities among tourists. Tourists flock to these islands throughout the year, except during the southwest monsoon months when seas are extremely rough.

Administration
The island belongs to the township of Agatti Island of Kavaratti Tehsil.

References

External links

Agatti Island Review
Lakshadweep a Photo Essay

Islands of Lakshadweep
Atolls of India
Cities and towns in Lakshadweep district
Lakshadweep
Lakshadweep articles by quality
Lakshadweep articles by importance
Water sports
Tourism articles by importance
Tourism articles by quality
Islands of India
Populated places in India